Martin Island or similar may refer to:

 Martin Island (Antarctica)
 Martin Islet, New South Wales
 Martin Islands, part of the Canadian Arctic Archipelago
 Martin Islands (Antarctica)

See also 
 Byam Martin Island
 Saint Martin Island (disambiguation)